Roberta Achtenberg (born July 20, 1950) is an American attorney who served as a commissioner on the United States Commission on Civil Rights. She was previously assistant secretary of the U.S. Department of Housing and Urban Development, becoming the first openly lesbian or gay public official in the United States whose appointment to a federal position was confirmed by the United States Senate.

Early life and education 
Achtenberg's father was Jewish and immigrated to the United States from the Soviet Union, while her mother was from Quebec. Both parents had minimal formal education. They owned a grocery store in Los Angeles and raised Roberta and her three siblings.

After graduating from Morningside High School in Inglewood, California, Achtenberg attended University of California, Los Angeles before graduating from University of California, Berkeley in 1972 with a Bachelor of Arts in history. At Berkeley, she met her ex-husband, David Chavkin. She began law school at University of California, Hastings College of the Law, before eventually receiving her Juris Doctor from the University of Utah in 1975.

Career 
Before becoming a public official, Achtenberg worked for more than 15 years as a civil rights attorney, nonprofit director, and legal educator. Achtenberg supported the LGBTQ community early in her political career. Her activity included co-founding the National Center for Lesbian Rights. Between 1975 and 1976, she served as a teaching fellow at Stanford University Law School. In 1976, Achtenberg became the Dean of the New College of California School of Law. Additionally, in 1978 Achtenberg represented LGBTQ rights while in the Anti-Sexism Committee for the National Lawyers Guild. While working for the organization, she edited Sexual Orientation and the Law (1985).

Achtenberg unsuccessfully ran for a seat in the 1988 California State Assembly special election to replace Art Agnos, losing to John Burton. She was elected as a member of the San Francisco Board of Supervisors in 1990, in the first time that two lesbians (alongside Carole Migden) won seats to the board.

While still serving on the Board of Supervisors in 1992, Achtenberg was appointed to the committee drafting the National Democratic Party's platform.

In 1993, she was appointed Assistant Secretary for the Office of Fair Housing and Equal Opportunity by President Bill Clinton, becoming the first 'out,' LGBTQ person to be appointed and confirmed to a position within a cabinet office. Later, she was appointed as the senior advisor to the Secretary of United States Department of Housing and Urban Development.

Achtenberg left the post in 1995 to run for mayor of San Francisco, and placed third behind Frank Jordan and Willie Brown (who would win in the runoff).  From 1998 to 2004, Achtenberg helped develop the policies for both the San Francisco Chamber of Commerce and the San Francisco Center for Economic Development. In 2000, she became the Director of the Bank of San Francisco and Andrew J. Wong, Inc. She served as Senior Vice President for Public Policy at the San Francisco Chamber of Commerce until January 2005. In 2000, she was appointed to the Board of Trustees of California State University by Governor Gray Davis, becoming chair of the board in May 2006, serving on the CSU Board of Trustees until 2015.

Achtenberg was in charge of the Housing and Urban Development Department's Agency Review Team that assisted the Obama administration during its transition to office. On January 26, 2011, President Barack Obama named Achtenberg to the United States Commission on Civil Rights.

Personal life 
Achtenberg met her former partner, Mary Morgan, judge on the San Francisco Municipal Court, in 1981. In 1985, Achtenberg and Morgan had a child, Benjamin.

Awards 

2003, awarded the first ever Public Administration Program Award for Public Service by San Francisco State University in recognition of Achtenberg's outstanding career in public service
1997, one of the "50 Most Influential Businesswomen in the Bay Area"
1994, GLAAD Media Awards, Visibility Award
Founders Award from the National Center for Lesbian Rights
In 2012, she was named by Equality Forum as one of their 31 Icons of the LGBT History Month.
Award of Excellence by the National Community Reinvestment Coalition 
Awarded "Woman of the Year" by the California State Senate for the Third District 
Management Volunteer of the Year by the United Way, Bay Area 
Lambda Legal Defense and Education Fund Achievement Award
Southern California Women for Understanding Achievement Award
National Organization for Women, Women of Achievement Award

Publications 
 "Behavior Modification: Legal Limitations on Methods and Goals", 50 Notre Dame Lawyer 230 (1975)
 Sexual Orientation and the Law, by Roberta Achtenberg (editor) (1985) 
 "Partner Benefits Litigation: Expanding Definitions of the Family", Matthew bender Family Law Monthly (May 1987)
 The Adoptive and Foster Gay and Lesbian Parent, in Gay and Lesbian Parents, Bozett, Ed., Praeger Press (1987) 
 Nicaragua's New Constitution: Report of August 1986 National Lawyers Guild Delegation to Nicaragua (May 1987)
 Aids and Child Custody: A Guide to Advocacy, National Center for Lesbian Rights (1989)
 The Lesbian and Gay Book of Love and Marriage: Creating the Stories of Our Lives, by Paula Martinac, Roberta Achtenberg (contributor) (1998) 
 Preserving and Protecting the Families of Lesbians and Gay Men, National Center for Lesbian Rights (1986, 1990)
 Lesbian Mother Litigation Manual, Second Edition, national Center for Lesbian Rights, with Donna Hitchens (1990) 
 Protecting the Lesbian Family in Our Right to Love, Vida, Ed, (1990) 
 Helping Gay and Lesbian Youth: New Policies, New Programs, New Practice, by Teresa Decrescenzo (editor), Roberta Achtenberg (contributor) (1994)

References

External links 
Senate Confirmation Roll Call Vote
Roberta Achtenberg on glbtq.com
http://nanobusiness.org/info/about/advisoryBoard/index_html/robertaAchtenberg 
 

American civil rights lawyers
20th-century American women politicians
Women city councillors in California
San Francisco Board of Supervisors members
American LGBT city council members
LGBT history in San Francisco
LGBT appointed officials in the United States
United States Commission on Civil Rights members
Democratic Party San Francisco Bay Area politicians
Lesbian politicians
American lesbians
Jewish American people in California politics
Jewish women politicians
LGBT people from the San Francisco Bay Area
Lesbian Jews
University of California, Berkeley alumni
University of Utah alumni
American people of German descent
American people of Russian-Jewish descent
American people of Canadian descent
1950 births
Living people
Morningside High School alumni
21st-century American Jews
21st-century American women politicians
1993 in LGBT history